DD7 can refer to:
DD7, a postcode district in the DD postcode area
Didi Seven
 a Lotus 7 inspired kit car